Freediving, free-diving, free diving, breath-hold diving, or skin diving is a form of underwater diving that relies on breath-holding until resurfacing rather than the use of breathing apparatus such as scuba gear.

Besides the limits of breath-hold, immersion in water and exposure to high ambient pressure also have physiological effects that limit the depths and duration possible in freediving.

Examples of freediving activities are traditional fishing techniques, competitive and non-competitive freediving, competitive and non-competitive spearfishing and freediving photography, synchronised swimming, underwater football, underwater rugby, underwater hockey, underwater target shooting and snorkeling. There are also a range of "competitive apnea" disciplines; in which competitors attempt to attain great depths, times, or distances on a single breath.

Historically, the term free diving was also used to refer to scuba diving, due to the freedom of movement compared with surface supplied diving.

History

In ancient times freediving without the aid of mechanical devices was the only possibility, with the exception of the occasional use of reeds and leather breathing bladders. The divers faced the same problems as divers today, such as decompression sickness and blacking out during a breath hold. Freediving was practiced in ancient cultures to gather food, harvest resources such as sponge and pearl, reclaim sunken valuables, and to help aid military campaigns.

In Ancient Greece, both Plato and Homer mention the sponge as being used for bathing. The island of Kalymnos was a main centre of diving for sponges. Harvesting of red coral was also done by divers.

The Mediterranean had large amounts of maritime trade. As a result of shipwrecks, particularly in the fierce winter storms, divers were often hired to salvage whatever they could from the seabed. Divers would swim down to the wreck and choose the most valuable pieces to salvage.

Divers were also used in warfare. Defenses against sea vessels were often created, such as underwater barricades, and hence divers were often used to scout out the seabed when ships were approaching an enemy harbor. If barricades were found, it was divers who were used to disassemble them, if possible. During the Peloponnesian War, divers were used to get past enemy blockades to relay messages as well as supplies to allies or troops that were cut off, and in 332 BC, during the Siege of Tyre, the city used divers to cut the anchor cables of Alexander's attacking ships.

In Japan, ama divers began to collect pearls about 2,000 years ago.
For thousands of years, most seawater pearls were retrieved by divers working in the Indian Ocean, in areas such as the Persian Gulf, the Red Sea, and in the Gulf of Mannar (between Sri Lanka and India). A fragment of Isidore of Charax's Parthian itinerary was preserved in Athenaeus's 3rd-century Sophists at Dinner, recording freediving for pearls around an island in the Persian Gulf.

Pearl divers near the Philippines were also successful at harvesting large pearls, especially in the Sulu Archipelago.  At times, the largest pearls belonged by law to the sultan, and selling them could result in the death penalty for the seller.  Nonetheless, many pearls made it out of the archipelago by stealth, ending up in the possession of the wealthiest families in Europe. Pearling was popular in Qatar, Bahrain, Japan, and India. The Gulf of Mexico was also known for pearling.
Native Americans harvested freshwater pearls from lakes and rivers like the Ohio, Tennessee, and Mississippi, while others dived for marine pearls from the Caribbean and waters along the coasts of Central and South America.

In 1940, Dottie Frazier pioneered freediving for women in the United States and also began teaching classes. It was also during this time that she began to design and sell rubber suits for Navy UDT divers.

Freediving activities

Recreational hunting and gathering

Spearfishing

Spearfishing is an ancient method of fishing that has been used throughout the world for millennia. Early civilizations were familiar with the custom of spearing fish from rivers and streams using sharpened sticks.

Today modern spearfishing makes use of elastic powered spearguns and slings, or compressed gas pneumatic powered spearguns, to strike the hunted fish. Specialised techniques and equipment have been developed for various types of aquatic environments and target fish. Spearfishing may be done using free-diving, snorkelling, or scuba diving techniques. Spearfishing while using scuba equipment is illegal in some countries. The use of mechanically powered spearguns is also outlawed in some countries and jurisdictions. Spearfishing is highly selective, normally uses no bait and has limited by-catch.

Collection of shellfish
Some types of shellfish are collected by freediving. Examples include the historical recreational collection of abalone in South Africa, before illegal harvesting reduced stocks to levels which resulted in recreational collection being banned indefinitely. This did not stop the illegal harvesting as it was very lucrative.

Competitive breath-hold watersports

Aquathlon
Aquathlon (also known as underwater wrestling) is an underwater sport where two competitors wearing masks and fins wrestle underwater in an attempt to remove a ribbon from each other's ankle band in order to win the bout. The "combat" takes place in a 5-metre (16 ft) square ring within a swimming pool, and is made up of three 30-second rounds, with a fourth round played in the event of a tie. The sport originated during the 1980s in the former USSR (now Russia) and was first played at international level in 1993. It was recognised by the Confédération Mondiale des Activités Subaquatiques (CMAS) in 2008.

Competitive spearfishing
Competitive spearfishing is defined by the world governing body CMAS as "the hunting and capture of fish underwater without the aid of artificial breathing devices, using gear that depends entirely on the physical strength of the competitor." They publish a set of competition rules that are used by affiliated organisations.

Synchronised swimming

Synchronized swimming is a hybrid form of swimming, dance, and gymnastics, consisting of swimmers (either solos, duets, trios, combos, or teams) performing a synchronized routine of elaborate moves in the water, accompanied by music. Synchronized swimming demands advanced water skills, and requires great strength, endurance, flexibility, grace, artistry and precise timing, as well as exceptional breath control when upside down underwater. During lifts swimmers are not allowed to touch the bottom.

Traditionally it was a women's sport, but following the addition of a new mixed-pair event, FINA World Aquatics competitions are open to men since the 16th 2015 championships in Kazan, and the other international and national competitions allow male competitors in every event. However, men are currently still barred from competing in the Olympics. Both USA Synchro and Synchro Canada allow men to compete with women. Most European countries also allow men to compete, and France even allows male only podiums, according to the number of participants. In the past decade, more men are becoming involved in the sport and a global biannual competition called Men's Cup has been steadily growing.

Swimmers perform two routines for the judges, one technical and one free, as well as age group routines and figures. Synchronized swimming is both an individual and team sport. Swimmers compete individually during figures, and then as a team during the routine. Figures are made up of a combination of skills and positions that often require control, strength, and flexibility.  Swimmers are ranked individually for this part of the competition. The routine involves teamwork and synchronization. It is choreographed to music and often has a theme. Synchronized swimming is governed internationally by FINA (Fédération Internationale de Natation).

Underwater hockey

Underwater Hockey, (also called Octopush (mainly in the United Kingdom)) is a globally played limited-contact sport in which two teams compete to manoeuvre a puck across the bottom of a swimming pool into the opposing team's goal by propelling it with a pusher.  It originated in England in 1954 when Alan Blake, the founder of the newly formed Southsea Sub-Aqua Club, invented the game he called Octopush as a means of keeping the club's members interested and active over the cold winter months when open-water diving lost its appeal. Underwater Hockey is now played worldwide, with the Confédération Mondiale des Activités Subaquatiques, abbreviated CMAS, as the world governing body. The first Underwater Hockey World Championship was held in Canada in 1980 after a false start in 1979 brought about by international politics and apartheid.

Underwater football

Underwater football is a two-team underwater sport that shares common elements with underwater hockey and underwater rugby. As with both of those games, it is played in a swimming pool with snorkeling equipment (mask, snorkel, and fins). The goal of the game is to manoeuvre (by carrying and passing) a slightly negatively buoyant ball from one side of a pool to the other by players who are completely submerged underwater. Scoring is achieved by placing the ball (under control) in the gutter on the side of the pool. Variations include using a toy rubber torpedo as the ball, and weighing down buckets to rest on the bottom and serve as goals.

It is played in the Canadian provinces of Alberta, Manitoba, Newfoundland and Labrador, and Saskatchewan.

Underwater rugby
Underwater rugby is an underwater team sport. During a match two teams try to score a negatively buoyant ball (filled with saltwater) into the opponents’ goal at the bottom of a swimming pool. It originated from within the physical fitness training regime existing in German diving clubs during the early 1960s and has little in common with rugby football except for the name. It was recognised by the Confédération Mondiale des Activités Subaquatiques (CMAS) in 1978 and was first played as a world championship in 1980.

Underwater target shooting
Underwater target shooting is an underwater sport that tests a competitors’ ability to accurately use a speargun via a set of individual and team events conducted in a swimming pool using free diving or apnea technique.  The sport was developed in France during the early 1980s and is currently practised mainly in Europe.  It is known as Tir sur cible subaquatique in French and as Tiro al Blanco Subacuático in Spanish.

Competitive apnea

Competitive freediving is currently governed by two world associations: AIDA International and Confédération Mondiale des Activités Subaquatiques (CMAS). Historically, there were two more organisations that regulated freediving records and activities — International Association of Freedivers (IAFD) and Freediving Regulations and Education Entity (FREE). Each organization has its own rules on recognizing a record attempt which can be found on the organization's website. Alongside competitive disciplines, there are record disciplines — disciplines that are not held in competitions, that are just for setting world records. There is a third organization, Guiness, which in addition to AIDA and CMAS presides over record disciplines.

Almost all types of competitive freediving are individual sports based on the best individual achievement. Exceptions to this rule are the bi-annual AIDA Team World Championship, where the combined score of the team members makes up the team's total points, and Skandalopetra diving competitions held by CMAS, the only truly ‘team’ event in freediving for which teams are formed by two athletes: one acting as the diver and the other acting as an assistant.

Disciplines 
There are currently eleven recognized disciplines defined by AIDA and CMAS, and a dozen more that are only practiced locally. All disciplines can be practiced by both men and women, and only CMAS currently separates records in fresh water from those at sea. The disciplines of AIDA can be done both in competition and as a record attempt, with the exception of variable weight and no limits, which are both solely for record attempts. For all AIDA depth disciplines, the depth the athlete will attempt is announced before the dive; this is accepted practice for both competition and record attempts. Most divers choose monofin (MF) over bifins (BF) where there is a choice.

Overview of the above disciplines

World records
The best official result in static apnea is the Guinness WR of 11:54 by Branko Petrović in 2014, a freediver who has results over 10 minutes under both AIDA and CMAS.
The best no limits result is 253.2m by Herbert Nitsch in 2012; his intention of having the dive sanctioned by AIDA fell through due to a sponsoring conflict.
After 2001, AIDA International no longer separated the records achieved in fresh water from those in the sea.

AIDA recognized world records
The AIDA recognized world records are:

CMAS recognized world records
, the CMAS recognized world records are:

Guinness recognized world records
The following table only includes those disciplines that are modifications of existing AIDA or CMAS disciplines and Guinness-exclusive (as it recognizes and inherits some AIDA/CMAS records) or Guinness-conceived (CMAS and AIDA do/did sanction at some time) disciplines.

:

Recreational

Freediving as a recreational activity is widely practiced and differs significantly from scuba diving. Although there are potential risks to all freediving, it can be safely practiced using a wide range of skill levels from the average snorkeler to the professional freediver. Compared to scuba diving, freediving offers:

 Freedom from cumbersome equipment and short preparation times.
 Low cost.
 It is quiet and does not disturb fish, the noise of breathing and bubbles can be quite loud on open circuit scuba though rebreathers are much quieter. 
 Mobility and speed, but for a much more limited period.
 No decompression time for deep dives, although it is possible to get decompression sickness, or taravana, from repetitive deep free-diving with short surface intervals.
 The lack of exhaled air bubbles on ascent gives greater visibility on ascent.
 Accessibility, if the site can be walked to it can, potentially, be dived.
 Appropriately skilled and fit freedivers can go as deep, or deeper than, recreational scuba divers, the depth being limited only by the willingness to accept the risks; scuba diving is restricted by the level of certification.

Freshwater springs, often with excellent visibility, provide good freediving opportunities but with greater risks. Diving into spring caverns with restricted access to the surface is very different from diving in open water. The time available to a freediver to solve problems underwater before hypoxia sets in is severely restricted in comparison with scuba. Freediving into confined cave systems such as Eagle's Nest Cave, Florida and Blue Springs State Park, Florida has resulted in several deaths. Cave freediving is commonly discouraged in basic freediver safety training.

Physiology

The human body has several oxygen-conserving adaptations that manifest under diving conditions as part of the mammalian diving reflex. The adaptations include:
Reflex bradycardia: Significant drop in heart rate.
Blood-shift: Blood flow and volume is redistributed towards vital organs by means of a reflex vasoconstriction. Blood vessels distend and become engorged, which in the case of the pulmonary capillaries assists with pressure compensation that comes with increasing diving depth, and without which a largely air-filled chest cavity would simply collapse for lack of compliance.
 Body-cooling: peripheral vasoconstriction results in cooling of peripheral tissue beds, which lower their oxygen demand in a thermodynamic manner. In addition, Murat et al. (2013) recently discovered that breath-holding results in prompt and substantial brain cooling, just like in diving birds and seals. (Dry) breath-holds result in cooling on the order of about 1 °C/minute, but this is likely to be greater with cold water submersion, in proportion to the magnitude and promptness of the dive response.
Splenic contraction: Releasing red blood cells carrying oxygen.

Techniques

Breath-holding ability, and hence dive performance, is a function of on-board oxygen stores, scope for metabolic rate reduction, efficient oxygen utilization, and hypoxia tolerance. Athletes attempt to accomplish this in various ways. Some divers use "packing", which increases lung volume beyond normal total lung capacity. In addition, training is allocated to enhance blood and muscle oxygen stores, to a limited extent.
Most divers rely on increasing fitness by increasing lung capacity. Simple breath-holding practice is highly effective for increasing lung capacity. In an interview on the radio talk show Fresh Air, journalist James Nestor, author of the book Breath: The New Science of a Lost Art, stated: "Some divers have a lung capacity of 14 liters, which is about double the size for a typical adult male. They weren't born this way. ... They trained themselves to breathe in ways to profoundly affect their physical bodies."

Ascent

Training
Training for freediving can take many forms, some of which can be performed on land. The University of Miami presents a scientific freediving class that was developed by Claire Paris, a professor and freediver, the class is the first of its kind at the university.

One example is the apnea walk. This consists of a preparation "breathe-up", followed by a short (typically 1 minute) breath hold taken at rest. Without breaking the hold, participants then begin walking as far as possible until it becomes necessary to breathe again. Athletes can do close to 400 meters in training this way.

This form of training is good for accustoming muscles to work under anaerobic conditions, and for tolerance to CO2 build-up in the circulation. It is also easy to gauge progress, as increasing distance can be measured.

Before competition attempts, freedivers perform a preparation sequence, which usually consists of physical stretching, mental exercise and breath exercise. It may include a succession of variable length static apnea and special purging deep breaths. Results of the preparation sequence are slower metabolism, lower heart rate and breath rate, and lower levels of carbon dioxide in the bloodstream and overall mental equilibrium.

Safety

Hazards
 
The most obvious hazard is lack of access to air for breathing – a necessity for human life. This can result in asphyxia from drowning if the diver does not reach the surface while still capable of holding their breath and resuming breathing. The risk depends on several factors, including the depth, duration and shape of the dive profile.

Latent hypoxia is a specific hazard of deeper freedives. This effect can cause hypoxic blackout during surfacing.

There are also a wide range of environmental hazards possible specific to the site and water and weather conditions at the time of diving, and there may be other hazards specific to the freediving activity.

Risk

Failing to respond to physiological warning signals, or crossing the mental barrier by strong will, may lead to blackout underwater or on reaching the surface. Trained freedivers are well aware of this and competitions must be held under strict supervision and with competent first-aiders on standby. However, this does not eliminate the risk of blackout. Freedivers are encouraged by certification and sporting organisations to dive only with a 'buddy' who accompanies them, observing from in the water at the surface, and ready to dive to the rescue if the diver loses consciousness during the ascent. This is only reasonably practicable if the water clarity allows observation, and the buddy is capable of safely reaching the diver. Due to the nature of the sport, the risks of freediving can be reduced by strict adherence to safety measures as an integral part of the activity, but cannot be eliminated entirely. Competition rules may require all participants to be adept in rescue and resuscitation.

Statistics and notable accidents

Nicholas Mevoli, a diver from New York died on 17 November 2013 after losing consciousness on surfacing from a 3-minute 38 second dive to a depth of  during an official record attempt in the "constant weight without fins" event. He had previously reached greater depths and longer times in other disciplines.

Fiction and documentaries

Documentaries
Ocean Men (2001) is a documentary film about the art and science of freediving, featuring two of its most outstanding exponents: Francisco "Pipín" Ferreras and Umberto Pelizzari.
My Pilot, Whale (2014) is a short documentary film directed by Alexander and Nicole Gratovsky, demonstrating direct communication between a human and free pilot whales in the open ocean. The entire underwater part was shot without underwater breathing equipment; both the operator and the person appearing in the frame are freediving.

Fiction
In the film Mission Impossible - Rogue Nation, Tom Cruise plays super spy Ethan Hunt fighting the forces of evil, and goes freediving in a scene to expose the villains.
The Pearl by John Steinbeck (1947) is a novel about a poor pearl diver, Kino, who finds the 'Pearl of Heaven', which is exceptionally valuable, changing his life forever.  The novel explores themes of man's nature as well as greed and evil.
In South Sea Adventure (1952) by Willard Price the Hunt brothers, marooned on a coral island, use free diving to collect both pearls and fresh water.
In Ian Fleming's (1964) James Bond novel You Only Live Twice, the character Kissy Suzuki is an ama diver. This connection was also mentioned in the film version.
Man from Atlantis was a 1970s TV series which featured a superhero with the ability to breathe underwater and freedive in his own special way.
The Big Blue (1988) is a romantic film about two world-class freedivers, a heavily fictionalized depiction of the rivalry of freedivers Jacques Mayol and Enzo Maiorca.
In the movie Phoenix Blue (2001), protagonist Rick is a musician who freedives competitively.
The children's novel The Dolphins of Laurentum by Caroline Lawrence (2003), which takes place in ancient Rome, describes the applications of freediving (sponge and pearl diving) and its hazards, as one of the principal characters, as well as the main antagonist, try to beat each other to a sunken treasure.
The Freediver (2004) is a film about a talented female freediver who is discovered and brought to an island, where she is trained by an ambitious scientist to break a freediving world record currently held by an American woman.
In the film Into the Blue (2005) starring Jessica Alba, a group of divers find themselves in deep trouble with a drug lord after they come upon the illicit cargo of a sunken airplane in the Caribbean.  Jessica Alba is an accomplished freediver, and did much of the underwater work; some other stunts were performed by Mehgan Heaney-Grier.
In Greg Iles' novel Blood Memory (2005), the main character Cat Ferry is an odontologist and a freediver.
H2O: Just Add Water Series 3 added a freediver (Will Benjamin played by Luke Mitchell) as a regular.  Freediving is featured in some episodes.
The Greater Meaning of Water (2010) is an independent film about competitive constant weight freediving, focusing on the 'zen' of freediving.
In the Canadian television series Corner Gas, the character Karen Pelly (Tara Spencer-Nairn) competed in static apnea, ranking fifth in Canada with a personal best of over six minutes.
In the American television series Baywatch episode "The Chamber" (Session 2, Episode 17), the character Mitch Buchannon rescues a diver trapped 90 feet below the ocean surface, but almost dies while suffering the effects of decompression sickness; decompression sickness is highly improbable following freediving exposure to this depth.
In the book Hornblower and the Atropos, CS Forester's character Horatio Hornblower is tasked by the Royal Navy to retrieve sunken treasure with the help of freediving Sinhalese pearl divers
In the film Avatar: The Way of Water the Metkayina Clan of the Na'vi have adapted to freediving and have built their entire culture around it, which they teach to the Sully family.
In Black Panther: Wakanda Forever a Mayan priest freedives and discovers a mutated plant that is used to mutate this tribe in merpeople.

See also

References

Further reading
DeeperBlue.com (2016) The Beginners Guide to Freediving, published by DeeperBlue.com
Callagy, Feargus (2012) A Beginners Guide to Freediving, e-book published by DeeperBlue.com 
Donald, Ian (2013) Underwater foraging – Freediving for food, Createspace publishing, USA. 
Farrell, Emma (2006) One Breath: A Reflection on Freediving, photographs by Frederic Buyle, Pynto Ltd., Hatherley, UK: 
Pelizzari, Umberto & Tovaglieri, Stefano (2001) Manual of Freediving: Underwater on a single breath, English translation 2004 by Idelson-Gnocchi Ltd., Reddick, FL: 
Severinsen, Stig A. (2010) Breathology: The Art of Conscious Breathing, Idelson-Gnocchi Ltd., Reddick, FL: 
James Nestor (2015) "Deep: Freediving, Renegade Science, and What the Ocean Tells Us About Ourselves", Eamon Dolan/Mariner Books New York, NY:

External links

AIDA International
Collaborative cartography of freediving spots/Cartographie collaborative des spots apnée 
DeeperBlue website
The Beginners Guide to Freediving - published by DeeperBlue.com
FreedivingCourses.com - a way to find Freediving instructors and dive centers around the world
DiveWise.Org - non profit organization dedicated to freediving education and safety
Explore Freediving - Freediving and Snorkeling events and instructor directory
Freediving Spots
  Borgosub.fr    French association to promote Wreck freediving
Freitauchen-lernen.com - deutschsprachiger Freediving Blog
www.apnoetauchen-lernen.de - German Center for education and development of freediving.

 
Individual sports
Underwater sports